Catherine Cuthbertson (c. 1775 – June 1842) was an English-language novelist published in London in the early 19th century. She may also have written an unpublished 1803 play under the name "Miss Cuthbertson".

Unknowns
Cuthbertson's origins are not known, although it appears that she was born before 1780, was the daughter of an army officer, and had at least four siblings. She is thought to have died some time after her final known book appeared in 1830. Suppositions that she was a sister of Helen Craik have not been substantiated. Research in 2016 at the University of Kent revealed that "Kitty" Cuthbertson was well known in her time. A burial record discovered indicates that she died in Ealing in June 1842, possibly aged 67. This would make her date of birth about 1775.

Works
Among her works were Romance of the Pyrenees (1803), Forest of Montalbano (1810), Adelaide; or, The Countercharm (1813), Rosabella, or A Mother's Marriage (1817), The Hut and the Castle: a Romance (1823), and Sir Ethelbert; or, the Dissolution of Monasteries (1830).<ref>Joanne Shattock: Cambridge Bibliography of English Literature, Vol. 4; Volumes 1800–1900 (Cambridge, UK: CUP), 2000.</ref> At least one, Santo Sebastiano (1806), was published twice in penny instalments, as The Heiress of Montalvan, or First and Second Love(1845–46) and as Santo Sebastiano, or The Heiress of Montalvan (1847–48).

Cuthbertson has been described by present-day scholars as a "fairly conventional novelist" using "historically realised settings (often in continental Europe)" with "happy endings". Her upper-class characters appear virtuous, her lower-class ones comic or occasionally horrific. There are many incidents of fainting.

A recent anthologist puts her among "the best of the Radcliffe imitators." Romance of the Pyrenees was serialized in the Lady's Magazine, starting in February 1804, but not in book form, "probably because the expected second sale did not warrant the cost." It took three years and "is the longest novel ever published in an eighteenth-century miscellany, with the single exception of Pamela." The work was also translated into French, but attributed there to Radcliffe, and German. Sir Ethelbert has been noted as having footnotes which reflect wide historical reading.

See also
List of Minerva Press authors
Minerva Press

External source
Online editions of her novels: the Online Books Page Retrieved 28 November 2015. (However, those listed include Phœbe; or, The Miller's Maid'', which is more usually attributed to James Malcolm Rymer.)

References

English women novelists
19th-century English novelists
19th-century English women writers
19th-century English writers
Writers of Gothic fiction
1775 births
1842 deaths